Atwell Township is one of fourteen townships in Rowan County, North Carolina, United States. The township had a population of 11,226 according to the 2000 census.

Geographically, Atwell Township occupies  in southwestern Rowan County.  There are no incorporated municipalities in Atwell Township; however, there are other unincorporated communities located here, including Enochville.  The township's southern boundary is with Cabarrus County.

Townships in Rowan County, North Carolina
Townships in North Carolina